The Bishopric of Cammin (also Kammin, Kamień Pomorski) was both a former Roman Catholic diocese in the Duchy of Pomerania from 1140 to 1544, and a secular territory of the Holy Roman Empire (Prince-Bishopric) in the Kolberg (Kołobrzeg) area from 1248 to 1650.

The diocese comprised the areas controlled by the House of Pomerania in the 12th century, thus differing from the later territory of the Duchy of Pomerania by the exclusion of the Principality of Rügen and inclusion of Circipania, Mecklenburg-Strelitz, and the northern Uckermark and New March. The diocese was rooted in the Conversion of Pomerania by Otto of Bamberg in 1124 and 1128, and was dissolved during the Protestant Reformation, when the Pomeranian nobility adopted Lutheranism in 1534 and the last pre-reformatory bishop died in 1544. The Catholic diocese was succeeded by the Pomeranian Evangelical Church and suppressed until 1945, when its new incarnation, the Apostolic Administration of Kamień (Cammin), Lubusz and the Prelature of Piła was re-established, succeeded by the Diocese of Szczecin-Kamień in 1972, elevated to Archdiocese of Szczecin-Kamień in 1992. 

The secular territory of the former diocese continued to exist as a prince-bishopric and principality within the Duchy of Pomerania, and was dissolved in 1650 when it fell to Brandenburg-Prussia, becoming part of Brandenburgian Pomerania. The area of the former principality was administered as Fürstenthum county within the Prussian Province of Pomerania until its division in 1872.

History

After Duke Bolesław III Wrymouth of Poland had conquered Pomerania until 1121/22, Saint Otto of Bamberg between 1124 and 1128 Christianised the area. Otto's first mission in 1124 followed a failed mission by eremite Bernard in 1122, and was initiated by Bolesław with the approval of both Lothair III, Holy Roman Emperor, and Pope Callixtus II. Otto's second mission in 1128 was initiated by Lothair after a pagan reaction. Wartislaw I, Duke of Pomerania supported and aided both missions. Between the missions, he had expanded his duchy westward, up to Güstrow. These former Lutician areas were not subject to Polish overlordship, but claimed by the Holy Roman Empire. Otto during his lifetime did not succeed in founding a diocese, caused by a conflict of the archbishops of Magdeburg and Gniezno about ecclesiastical hegemony in the area. Otto died in 1139.

Pope Innocent II founded the diocese by a papal bull of 14 October 1140, and made the church of St. Adalbert at (Julin (Wollin/Wolin) on Wollin/Wolin island the see of the diocese. In the bull, the new diocese was placed "under the protection of the see of the Holy Peter", thwarting ambitions of the archbishops of Magdeburg and Gniezno, who both wanted to incorporate the new diocese as suffragan into their archdioceses. Adalbert, a former chaplain of Saint Otto who had participated in Otto's mission as an interpreter and assistant, was consecrated bishop at Rome. Adalbert and Ratibor I founded Stolpe Abbey at the side of Wartislaw I's assassination by a pagan in 1153, the first monastery in Pomerania.

The bishops held the title of Pomeranorum or Pomeranorum et Leuticorum episcopus, referring to the tribal territories of the Pomeranians and Luticians merged in the Duchy of Pomerania.

In the late 12th century the territory of the Griffin dukes was raided several times by Saxon troops of Henry the Lion and Danish forces under King Valdemar I. The initial see of in Wollin was moved to Grobe Abbey on the island of Usedom after 1150. At the same time Wollin economically decayed and was devastated by Danish expeditions, which contributed to the move to Grobe. The see was again moved to Cammin, now Kamień Pomorski, in 1175, where a chapter was founded for the Cathedral of St. John the Baptist. All this time, the question of subordinance of the Pomeranian diocese as suffragan to an archdiocese remained unsolved. Since 1188, when the pope accepted the move of the see, the bishopric was referred to as "Roman Catholic Diocese of Cammin", while before it was addressed as Pomeranensis ecclesia, Pomeranian diocese. The pope furthermore placed the bishopric as an exempt diocese directly under the Holy See. Since 1208, the bishops held the title Caminensis episcopus.

The area of the diocese resembled the area controlled by Wartislaw I and his brother and successor, Ratibor I. The northern border was defined by the coastline and the border with the Principality of Rügen (Ryck river). In the West, the diocese included Circipania up to Güstrow. In the Southwest, the border of the diocese ran south to a line Güstrow-Ivenack-Altentreptow in a near straight west–east orientation, then took a sharp southward turn west of Ueckermünde to include Prenzlau. The border then turned east to meet the Oder river south of Gartz and followed the Oder to the Warta (Warthe) confluence to include Zehden. In the South, the diocese border ran immediately north of the Warthe to include Landsberg and Soldin. The southeastern border left the Warthe area with a sharp turn running straight north to Dramburg, then turned eastwards south of the town to include Tempelburg. Then, after a southeast turn, it turned northeast towards Bütow. The eastern border ran east of Bütow and west of Lauenburg in Pomerania to meet the seacoast east of Revekol.

When Emperor Frederick I Barbarossa deposed Henry the Lion in 1180 he granted Pomerania under Bogislaw I the status of an Imperial duchy, but from 1185 it was a Danish fief until the 1227 Battle of Bornhöved. In 1248, the Cammin bishops and the Pomeranian dukes had interchanged the terrae Stargard and Kolberg, leaving the bishops in charge of the latter. In the following, the bishops extended their secular reign which soon comprised the Kolberg (now Kołobrzeg), Köslin (also Cöslin, now Koszalin) and Bublitz (now Bobolice) areas. When in 1276 they became the sovereign of the town of Kolberg also, they moved their residence there. Bishop Hermann von Gleichen founded the towns of Köslin (Koszalin) in 1266 and Massow (Maszewo) in 1278. The administration of the episcopal secular state was done from Köslin.

The bishops at multiple occasions tried to exclude their secular reign from ducal overlordship by applying for Imperial immediacy (Reichsunmittelbarkeit). The Pomeranian dukes successfully forestalled these ambitions, and immediacy was granted only temporarily in 1345. The addition of profane territory would be the basis for later turning the status of the diocese into a prince-bishopric. The episcopal territory of secular reign remained a subfief of ducal Pomerania, and did not become an immediately imperial fief.

The Protestant Reformation reached Pomerania in the early 16th century, mostly starting from the cities, and Lutheranism was made the Duchy of Pomerania's religion in 1534 by the diet of Treptow upo Rega (Trzebiatów). The Pomeranian reformator Johannes Bugenhagen, appointed bishop of Cammin by 1544, did not assume the office, the cathedral chapter elected instead Bartholomaeus Swawe, the former chancellor of Duke Barnim XI of Pomerania-Stettin, who promptly renounced Cammin's imperial immediacy. From 1556 on the Griffin dukes held also the office of a titular bishop ruling in Cammin's secular territory. In 1650 the last bishop Ernst Bogislaw von Croÿ resigned and the diocese was secularised. With Farther Pomerania it fell to Brandenburg-Prussia forming its Province of Pomerania.

Bishops of Cammin

Catholic bishops
 1140–1162: Adalbert of Pomerania 
 1163–1186: Conrad I of Salzwedel 
 1186–1202: Siegfried I 
 1202–1219: Siegwin 
 1219–1223: Conrad II von Demmin 
 1223–1245: Conrad III von Gützkow

Prince-Bishops
 1245–1252: Wilhelm 
 1252–1288: Hermann von Gleichen 
 1288–1298: Jaromar Prince of Rugia (son of Prince Wizlaw II)
 1298: Peter 
 1299–1317?: Heinrich von Wachholz 
 1317?–1324: Conrad IV 
 1324–1329: Wilhelm II 
 1324–1326: Otto (anti-bishop)
 1326–1329: Arnold von Eltz (anti-bishop)
 1329–1343: Friedrich von Eickstedt 
 1344–1372: John I of Saxe-Lauenburg, son of Eric I, Duke of Saxe-Lauenburg
 1372–1385: Philipp von Rehberg 
 1386–1394: John II Wilken von Kosselyn 
 1386–1392: Bogislaw VIII, Duke of Pomerania, diocesan administrator, ruling Pomerania-Stargard 1377–1417
 1394–1398: Bogislaw VIII, Duke of Pomerania, bishop elect, rivalling John III 
 1394–1398: John III Kropidło, Duke of Oppeln-Strehlitz, rivalling Bogislaw VIII
 1398–1410: Nikolaus Bock 
 1410–1424: Magnus of Saxe-Lauenburg, prince-bishop of Hildesheim, 1424–1452
 1424–1449: Siegfried II von Bock 
 1449–1469: Henning Iwen 
 1449–1471: sede vacante
 1471: Henning Kessebogen
 1471–1479: Count Ludwig von Eberstein-Naugard 
 1479: Nicolaus von Tüngen, also Prince-Bishop of Ermland (Warmia) 1467–1489
 1479–1482: Marinus Freganus 
 1482–1485: Angelo Geraldini, also Bishop of Sessa Aurunca 1462–1486
 1486–1498: Benedikt von Waldstein 
 1486–1488: Nikolaus Westphal, diocesan administrator
 1499–1521: Martin Karith 
 1521–1544: Erasmus von Manteuffel-Arnhausen, after 1532 he lost influence in the diocesan territory except of the episcopal secular area around Kolberg

Lutheran Bishops and Superintendents

 1544–1549: Bartholomaeus Suawe, bishop, only for the Lutheran state church in the secular episcopal area 
 1549–1556: Martin Weiher von Leba (de), bishop, only for the Lutheran state church in the secular episcopal area 
 1556–1558: vacancy, the succeeding administrators, colloquially called bishops, lacked any theological skills
 1558–1567: Georg Venetus, Stiftssuperintendent (i.e. superintendent of the Hochstift/prince-bishopric)
 1568–1602: Petrus Edeling, superintendent of the prince-bishopric 
 1605–1620: Adam Hamel, superintendent of the prince-bishopric 
 1622–1645: Immanuel König, superintendent of the prince-bishopric

Pomeranian Prince-Administrators ("Bishops")
 1556–1574: John Frederick, Duke of Pomerania, † 1600
 1574–1602: Casimir IX, Duke of Pomerania-Wolgast, † 1605
 1602–1618: Francis, Duke of Pomerania-Barth, † 1620
 1618–1623: Ulrich, Duke of Pomerania-Barth 
 1623–1637: Bogislaw XIV, Duke of Pomerania 
 1637–1650: Ernst Bogislaw von Croÿ, Prince of Croÿ, † 1684

See also
Roman Catholic Archdiocese of Szczecin-Kamień
Roman Catholic Diocese of Koszalin-Kołobrzeg

Notes

External links
Bishop list

Cammin prince-bishopric
Cammin prince-bishopric
Cammin
Cammin diocese
Cammin diocese
Cammin diocese